Jesse Edward Hobson (May 2, 1911 – November 5, 1970) was the director of SRI International from 1947 to 1955. Prior to SRI, he was the director of the Armour Research Foundation.

Early life and education
Hobson was born in Marshall, Indiana. He received bachelor's and master's degrees in electrical engineering from Purdue University and a PhD in electrical engineering from the California Institute of Technology. Hobson was also selected as a nationally outstanding engineer.

Hobson married Jessie Eugertha Bell on March 26, 1939, and they had five children.

Career

Awards and memberships
Hobson was named an IEEE Fellow in 1948.

References

1970 deaths
SRI International people
Purdue University College of Engineering alumni
California Institute of Technology alumni
Fellow Members of the IEEE
1911 births